Best Bout Boxing is a boxing arcade game released by Jaleco in 1994, where boxers have to compete for the fictional "1993 Worldfreeweight Championship" (no weight limitation).

List of characters

Jose Hum-Dinger from Mexico
Biff Vulgue from Australia
Carolde First from England
Jyoji Horiuchi from Japan
Kim Hi-Soo from South Korea
Thamalatt Zip from Thailand
Grute Smith from the USA
Draef Varona from Russia (final opponent; unplayable)

References

1994 video games
Arcade video games
Arcade-only video games
Boxing video games
Jaleco games
Fighting games
Video games developed in Japan